Leioproctus carinatifrons is a species of Australian bee. It is found in coastal regions of New South Wales, Victoria and South Australia, and feeds on the nectar of various species of Persoonia. It was first described in 1929 by T. D. A. Cockerell as Paracolletes carinatifrons. It is closely related to L. perpolitus from Western Australia

References

External links

Colletidae
Hymenoptera of Australia
Insects described in 1929
Taxa named by Theodore Dru Alison Cockerell